Le Droit  is a Canadian French-language daily newspaper, published in Gatineau, Quebec. Initially established and owned by the Missionary Oblates of Mary Immaculate, the paper was published by Martin Cauchon and his company, Capitales Médias, from 2015 - ? when a cooperative was formed by the employees to continue publishing the paper.

History
The newspaper was launched on March 27, 1913 as a tool to condemn Regulation 17, an Ontario law that restricted education in French at that time. Today, it defends federalism in Canada as well as provincial jurisdictions. It is still involved in the protection of francophone rights in Ontario, notably advocating for the survival of the Montfort Hospital during the government of Ontario premier Mike Harris.

In the 1960s, Le Droit tried to extend its market into Northeastern Ontario, including the North Bay, Timmins and Sudbury areas, all of which have large francophone populations. However, it quickly abandoned the project due to high costs. Originally published as a broadsheet, it switched to tabloid format in 1988, following an 11-week strike by the pressmen. The newspaper also had a previous strike in 1982.

In 2001, Gesca, a subsidiary of Power Corporation owned by Franco-Ontarian Paul Desmarais acquired the paper from Conrad Black's Hollinger, who owned it between 1987 and 2001. In the eighties, it belonged to Montreal-based Jacques Francoeur, the founder of Sunday weekly Dimanche-Matin, who built the Unimedia chain which included Le Soleil (Quebec City) and Le Quotidien (Chicoutimi, now Saguenay). He acquired Le Droit from the Oblates.

In 2015, Gesca sold six of its francophone titles, including Le Droit, to Martin Cauchon, a former minister in the Jean Chrétien government. Terms were not disclosed.

The publisher since 2007 is Jacques Pronovost. Before him, it was led by Claude Gagnon (2002–2007), Pierre Bergeron (1993–2002), Gilbert Lacasse (1987–1993) and Jean-Robert Bélanger ( – 1987). Managing editors have included Jean Gagnon (?), André Larocque (2006–2010), Michel Gauthier (2001–2006), François Roy (1994–2001), Claude Beauregard (1994), Gilbert Lavoie (1991–1994), and André Préfontaine (1989–1991).

Today
It is the only francophone daily newspaper currently published in Quebec for francophones who live in and around the city of Gatineau, directly across the Ottawa River from Ottawa, Ontario. It is also read by the Franco-Ontarian community and was the fourth all-time francophone newspaper (the previous three existed in the 19th century). Its articles can also be read on the internet in the Cyberpresse network, which also includes La Presse in Montreal,  Le Soleil in Quebec City, Le Nouvelliste in Trois-Rivières, La Tribune in Sherbrooke, La Voix de l'Est in Granby and Le Quotidien in Saguenay.

Its main offices were located near the ByWard Market with a second office located at Les Promenades Gatineau in Gatineau until the move to Gatineau. It currently has about 150 employees.

Controversy

In 2008, Sudbury's francophone community newspaper Le Voyageur published an editorial criticizing the Canadian Radio-television and Telecommunications Commission for its handling of Le5 Communications' application to acquire two francophone radio stations, CHYC-FM in Sudbury and CHYK-FM in Timmins. The paper took issue with the fact that the CRTC's original notice of hearing was published only in Le Droit, and not in any of the region's local media—thereby giving the francophone community in Northeastern Ontario little notice of either the pending transaction or the deadlines for reviewing and submitting comments regarding the application.

Notable staff
 Marcel Desjardins, political correspondent and sports journalist
 Pierre Dufault, political correspondent and sports journalist

See also
List of newspapers in Canada

References

External links
 Le Droit

Mass media in Ottawa–Gatineau
French-language newspapers published in Quebec
Newspapers established in 1913
Gesca Limitée publications
1913 establishments in Ontario
Daily newspapers published in Quebec